Events in the year 1842 in India.

Incumbents
The Earl of Ellenborough, Governor-General, 1842-44.

Events
 1st Afghan War, 1837-42.

Law

Births
16 January – Mahadev Govind Ranade, judge, author and reformer (died 1901).

References

 
India
Years of the 19th century in India